Calamoschoena sexpunctata is a moth in the family Crambidae. It was described by Per Olof Christopher Aurivillius in 1925. It is found in the Democratic Republic of the Congo.

References

Moths described in 1925
Schoenobiinae